Laguna Blanca is a peak in Argentina with an elevation of  metres. Laguna Blanca is the highest peak of Sierra de Laguna Blanca, a range within Puna de Atacama, a high plateau of the Andes. It is within the protected area "Natural Provincial Reserve and Biosphere of Laguna Blanca". Cerro Laguna Blanca is located within the territory of the Argentinean province of Catamarca. Its slopes are within the administrative boundaries of two Argentine cities: Antofagasta de la Sierra and Villa Vil.

First Ascent 

Although there are evidences of previous ascents on the summit (probably incan), Laguna Blanca's first reported climb was by Jaime Suarez (España), María Aguiar, Elsa Abrego, Adriana Agüero, Víctor Eduardo Carrizo, Norberto Cruz, Víctor Nieto, Juan Carlos Planas, Carlos Rodríguez Lastra and Aldo Vergara (Argentina) on December 07th 2006.

Elevation 
Other data from available digital elevation models: SRTM yields 5995 metres, ASTER 6006 metres, ASTER filled 5995 metres, ALOS 6006 metres, TanDEM-X 6035 metres. The height of the nearest key col is 4235 meters, leading to a topographic prominence of 1777 meters. Laguna Blanca is considered a Mountain Range according to the Dominance System  and its dominance is 29.56%. Its parent peak is Cachi and the Topographic isolation is 190 kilometers.

References

External links 

 Elevation information about Laguna Blanca
 Weather Forecast at Laguna Blanca

Six-thousanders of the Andes